Grande Fratello 14 was the fourteenth season of the Italian version of the reality show franchise Big Brother. The show premieres on 24 September 2015 and concluded on 10 December 2015. For the last time, Alessia Marcuzzi returned as the main host of the show. This also had a twist, which was housemates were divided in pairs.

Federica Lepanto emerged as the winner on Day 78.

Housemates

Guests 
This edition is characterized by the frequent presence of guests, who usually stay in the house for a week each. During their stay, the housemates have the task of discovering the various secrets of the guests.

If the housemates fail to discover the secret, they must serve punishments or the Grand prize amount is lowered.

Nominations table
Nominations were similar to Gran Hermano 15 (Spain). Each pair nominated two other pairs with 2 and 1 points.

Notes

External links 
 Official site 

2015 Italian television seasons
14